The Kouhrang 2 Hydroelectric Power Station is located just south of Chelgard and about  northwest of Shahrekord in Chaharmahal and Bakhtiari Province, Iran. Water from the Kouhrang is stored in a circular dam (Kouhrang 2 Dam) before being sent to the power station. The power station's three generators were commissioned between 2002 and 2004, the power plant were inaugurated in February 2005. Water discharged from the power station enters the Zayandeh River as part of a larger project to provide water to major cities like Isfahan. The Kouhrang 3 Dam is planned downstream to regulate river flows and divert more water to the Zayandeh via the Kouhrang 3 Tunnel.

See also

List of power stations in Iran

References

Hydroelectric power stations in Iran
Earth-filled dams
Dams completed in 2005
Dams in Chaharmahal and Bakhtiari Province
Interbasin transfer
Kuhrang County